The Soviet Football Championship, Class B (Soviet football championship (Class B)) was the second, third and for a season fourth highest division of Soviet football, below the Soviet Class A and then the Soviet Class A Second Group.

The league was formed in 1950 as the second tier of football competitions in the Soviet Union in place of the Second Group of the Soviet football championship. In 1960 Class B was split by republican (regional) principle and there existed Class B of the Russian SFSR, Class B of Ukraine, Class B of Union republics, Class B of Kazakhstan, Class B of Central Asia. With the expansion of Soviet Class A in 1963, the Soviet Class B was downgraded to the third tier and in 1970 even further to the fourth tier. Before 1971 it was abolished.

Winners

Second tier

Third tier

Fourth tier

References

2
Defunct second level football leagues in Europe
Defunct third level football leagues in Europe
Defunct fourth level football leagues in Europe
Sports leagues established in 1950
Sports leagues disestablished in 1970
1950 establishments in the Soviet Union
1970 disestablishments in the Soviet Union